The Spermonde Archipelago (also known as the Sangkarang or Pabbiring Archipelago) is a group of around 120 islands off the southwest coast of Sulawesi in Indonesia, located within the Coral Triangle, between the southern arc of Sulawesi and the Strait of Makassar. They comprise two administrative districts (Kecamatan Liukang Tupabbiring and Kecamatan Liukang Tupabbiring Utara) within the Pangkajene and Islands Regency of Indonesia's South Sulawesi Province. Situated west of Makassar, the archipelago covers a land area of approximately 141 km2, and comprises around 50 vegetated islands and 70 unvegetated sand cays, of which 43 in total are named. About 50 islands are inhabited, collectively home to 31,293 people at the 2020 Census, and officially estimated at 31,513 as at mid 2021.

References

External links

Archipelagoes of Indonesia
Landforms of South Sulawesi
Islands of the Java Sea